Etrabad (also Romanized as ʿEtrābād; also known as ) is a village in Aqda Rural District, Aqda District, Ardakan County, Yazd Province, Iran. At the 2006 census, its population was 30, in 10 families.

References 

Populated places in Ardakan County